Ham is a village in the Caithness region in the Scottish council area of Highland. It has a very short river running from a mill pond to the sea - a total distance of under 30m at high tide.

References

Populated places in Caithness
Orkneyinga saga places